Schlegel's Japanese gecko (Gekko japonicus), also known as yamori in Japanese, is a species of gecko. It is found in eastern China, Japan, and South Korea.

Distribution
Gekko japonicus occurs across the main islands of Japan, ranging from northern Honshu in the north and east to Kyushu in the south and west.

Ecology
Like other species of gecko, individuals of G. japonicus primarily eat insects. The species is capable of autotomy, and will separate its tail from its body to escape predators. While this process avoids bleeding, as blood vessels at the base of the tail close to prevent blood loss, the gecko does lose a supply of fat tissue, which it can use during periods where food is scarce.

Japanese culture
In Japanese culture, seeing a gecko on one's home is associated with good luck. The animal's name, yamori, translates to home-protector.

References

Gekko
Reptiles of China
Reptiles of Japan
Reptiles of Korea
Taxa named by Hermann Schlegel
Reptiles described in 1836

スマブラ